Join the Dots: B-Sides & Rarities is a box set of The Cure, released on 26 January 2004, by their former record label Fiction. (Elektra and Rhino co-released the compilation in North America.) This box set is a four-disc compilation of B-sides and rarities, digitally remastered by Chris Blair at Abbey Road Studios from their original tapes. The box set includes all B-sides by the band, apart from a number of remixes, as well a number of unreleased songs and songs that had been out of physical circulation for years. Many of the songs had not appeared on CD before. The set includes a booklet with track-by-track commentary and an extensive overview of the band's history up to 2004, followed by an extensive list of The Cure's discography.

The B-side "I'm Cold" features singer Siouxsie Sioux on backing vocals; the collaboration came at the time when The Cure were supporting Siouxsie and the Banshees on their 1979 British tour.

Some of the B-sides released between 1982 and 1983 were first compiled on the Japanese Whispers compilation album issued in late 1983.

Track listing

Disc 1 (1978–1987)
"10:15 Saturday Night" (Dempsey, Smith, Tolhurst) – 3:43 (Originally the B-side of "Killing an Arab", but also appears on Three Imaginary Boys and Boys Don't Cry, 1979)
"Plastic Passion" (Dempsey, Smith, Tolhurst) – 2:16 (Originally the B-side of "Boys Don't Cry", but also appears on Boys Don't Cry, 1979)
"Pillbox Tales" (Dempsey, Smith, Tolhurst) – 2:56 (Originally the B-side of the "Boys Don't Cry" 1986 12" rerelease, but recorded in 1979)
"Do the Hansa" (Dempsey, Smith, Tolhurst) – 2:40 (Originally the B-side of the "Boys Don't Cry" 1986 12" re-release, but recorded in 1979)
"I'm Cold" (Dempsey, Smith, Tolhurst) – 2:49 (Originally the B-side of "Jumping Someone Else's Train", 1979)
"Another Journey by Train" (Gallup, Hartley, Smith, Tolhurst) – 3:06 (Originally the B-side of "A Forest", 1980)
"Descent" (Gallup, Smith, Tolhurst) – 3:09 (Originally the B-side of "Primary", 1981)
"Splintered in Her Head" (Gallup, Smith, Tolhurst) – 5:17 (Originally the B-side of "Charlotte Sometimes", 1981)
"Lament" [Flexipop] (Smith) – 4:36 (Came on a vinyl record included on an issue of Flexipop, 1982)
"Just One Kiss" (Smith, Tolhurst) – 4:10 (Originally the B-side of "Let's Go to Bed", 1982)
"The Dream" (Smith) – 3:12 (Originally the B-side of "The Walk", 1983)
"The Upstairs Room" (Smith, Tolhurst) – 3:31 (Originally the extra B-side of "The Walk" 12", 1983)
"Lament" (Smith) – 4:25 (Originally the extra B-side of "The Walk" 12", 1983)
"Speak My Language" (Smith, Tolhurst) – 2:43 (Originally the B-side of "The Love Cats", 1983)
"Mr Pink Eyes" (Smith, Tolhurst) – 2:45 (Originally the extra B-side of "The Love Cats" 12", 1983)
"Happy the Man" (Smith) – 2:47 (Originally the B-side of "The Caterpillar", 1984)
"Throw Your Foot" (Smith) – 3:33 (Originally the extra B-side of "The Caterpillar" 12", 1984)
"New Day" (Smith, Tolhurst) – 4:10 (Originally the extra B-side of the 10" single of "Close to Me", 1985)
"The Exploding Boy" (Smith) – 2:54 (Originally the B-side of "In Between Days", 1985)
"A Few Hours After This..." (Smith) – 2:28 (Originally the extra B-side of "In Between Days" 12", 1985)
"A Man Inside My Mouth" (Smith) – 3:07 (Originally the B-side of "Close To Me", 1985)
"Stop Dead" (Smith) – 4:02 (Originally the extra B-side of "Close to Me" 12", 1985)

Disc 2 (1987–1992)
"A Japanese Dream" (Gallup, Smith, Thompson, Tolhurst, Williams) – 3:29 (Originally the B-side of "Why Can't I Be You?", 1987)
"Breathe" (Gallup, Smith, Thompson, Tolhurst, Williams) – 4:48 (Originally the B-side of "Catch", 1987)
"A Chain of Flowers" (Gallup, Smith, Thompson, Tolhurst, Williams) – 4:55 (Originally the extra B-side of "Catch" 12", 1987)
"Snow in Summer" (Gallup, Smith, Thompson, Tolhurst, Williams) – 3:27 (Originally the B-side of "Just Like Heaven", 1987)
"Sugar Girl" (Gallup, Smith, Thompson, Tolhurst, Williams) – 3:15 (Originally the extra B-side of "Just Like Heaven" 12", 1987)
"Icing Sugar" [Remix] (Gallup, Smith, Thompson, Tolhurst, Williams) – 3:23 (Extra track on Kiss Me, Kiss Me, Kiss Me orange vinyl bonus disc, 1987)
"Hey You!!!" [12" Extended Mix] (Gallup, Smith, Thompson, Tolhurst, Williams) – 4:08 (Originally the B-side of "Hot Hot Hot!!!", 1987)
"How Beautiful You Are..." [Bob Clearmountain Remix] (Gallup, Smith, Thompson, Tolhurst, Williams) – 4:25 (Extra track on Kiss Me, Kiss Me, Kiss Me Radio sampler CD, 1987)
"To the Sky" (Gallup, Smith, Thompson, Tolhurst, Williams) – 5:15 (Originally released on the Fiction compilation Stranger Than Fiction in 1989, but was recorded in 1987)
"Babble" (Gallup, O'Donnell, Smith, Thompson, Tolhurst, Williams) – 4:18 (Originally the B-side of "Lullaby" in the UK and "Fascination Street" in the U.S., 1989)
"Out of Mind" (Gallup, O'Donnell, Smith, Thompson, Tolhurst, Williams) – 3:51 (Originally an extra B-side on the 12" version of "Lullaby" and the 12" version of "Fascination Street", 1989)
"2 Late" (Gallup, O'Donnell, Smith, Thompson, Tolhurst, Williams) – 2:41 (Originally the B-side of "Lovesong", 1989)
"Fear of Ghosts" (Gallup, O'Donnell, Smith, Thompson, Tolhurst, Williams) – 6:51 (Originally the extra B-side of "Lovesong" 12", 1989)
"Hello, I Love You" [psychedelic version] (Densmore, Krieger, Manzarek, Morrison) – 6:04 (Previously unreleased, but recorded in 1990)
"Hello I Love You" (Densmore, Krieger, Manzarek, Morrison) – 3:31 (Originally from the Elektra CD Rubiyat, 1990, cover of a song by The Doors)
"Hello I Love You" [Slight Return Mix] (Densmore, Krieger, Manzarek, Morrison) – 0:13 (Originally from the Elektra CD Rubaiyat, 1990)
"Harold and Joe" (Gallup, Smith, Thompson, Williams) – 5:09 (Originally the B-side of "Never Enough", 1990)
"Just Like Heaven" [Dizzy Mix] (Gallup, Smith, Thompson, Tolhurst, Williams) – 3:43 (Originally the B-side of the "Close to Me" Closest Mix re-release, 1990)

Disc 3 (1992–1996)
"This Twilight Garden" (Bamonte, Gallup, Smith, Thompson, Williams) – 4:45 (Originally the B-side of "High", 1992)
"Play" (Bamonte, Gallup, Smith, Thompson, Williams) – 4:36 (Originally the extra B-side of "High" 12", 1992)
"Halo" (Bamonte, Gallup, Smith, Thompson, Williams) – 3:47 (Originally the B-side of "Friday I'm in Love", 1992)
"Scared as You" (Bamonte, Gallup, Smith, Thompson, Williams) – 4:12 (Originally the extra B-side of "Friday I'm in Love" 12", 1992)
"The Big Hand" (Bamonte, Gallup, Smith, Thompson, Williams) – 4:53 (Originally the B-side of "A Letter to Elise", 1992)
"A Foolish Arrangement" (Bamonte, Gallup, Smith, Thompson, Williams) – 3:51 (Originally the extra B-side of "A Letter to Elise" 12", 1992)
"Doing the Unstuck" [Saunders 12" Remix] (Bamonte, Gallup, Smith, Thompson, Williams) – 5:55 (Previously unreleased remix made in 1992, intended for a "Doing the Unstuck" single that never came to be, 1992)
"Purple Haze" (Virgin Radio Version) (Hendrix) – 3:18 (Originally unreleased 12" version, 1993)
"Purple Haze" (Hendrix) – 5:22 (Originally from Stone Free: A Tribute to Jimi Hendrix, 1993)
"Burn" (Bamonte, Gallup, Smith, Williams) – 6:37 (Originally from The Crow official soundtrack, 1994)
"Young Americans" (Bowie) – 6:23 (Originally from 104.9 XFM compilation, a cover of the David Bowie song coupled with the riff from Bowie's "The Wedding Song", 1995)
"Dredd Song" (Bamonte, Cooper, Gallup, O'Donnell, Smith) – 4:25 (Originally from the Judge Dredd official soundtrack, 1995)
"It Used to Be Me" (Bamonte, Cooper, Gallup, O'Donnell, Smith) – 6:50 (Originally the B-side to "The 13th", 1996)
"Ocean" (Bamonte, Cooper, Gallup, O'Donnell, Smith) – 3:29 (Originally the B-side to "The 13th", 1996)
"Adonais" (Bamonte, Cooper, Gallup, O'Donnell, Smith) – 4:11 (Originally the B-side to "The 13th", 1996)

Disc 4 (1996–2001)
"Home" (Bamonte, Cooper, Gallup, O'Donnell, Smith) – 3:24 (Originally the B-side to "Mint Car", 1996)
"Waiting" (Bamonte, Cooper, Gallup, O'Donnell, Smith) – 3:34 (Originally the B-side to "Mint Car", 1996)
"A Pink Dream" (Bamonte, Cooper, Gallup, O'Donnell, Smith) – 3:44 (Originally the B-side to "Mint Car", 1996)
"This Is a Lie" [Ambient Mix] (Bamonte, Cooper, Gallup, O'Donnell, Smith) – 4:32 (Originally the B-side to "Strange Attraction" in the U.S. and "Gone!" in the UK, 1996)
"Wrong Number" [P2P Remix] (Smith) – 8:14 (Originally one of the remixes from the "Wrong Number" single, remixed by Robert Smith in 1997)
"More Than This" (Smith) – 5:11 (Originally from The X-Files: The Album, 1998)
"World in My Eyes" (Gore) – 4:52 (Originally from For the Masses, an album of Depeche Mode covers, 1998)
"Possession" (Bamonte, Cooper, Gallup, O'Donnell, Smith) – 5:17 (Previously unreleased song from the Bloodflowers sessions, 2000)
"Out of This World" [Oakenfold Remix] (Bamonte, Cooper, Gallup, O'Donnell, Smith) – 7:01 (Previously unreleased remix, but made in 2000)
"Maybe Someday" [Hedges Remix] (Bamonte, Cooper, Gallup, O'Donnell, Smith) – 4:59 (Originally from the "Maybe Someday" promo-only CD, 2000)
"Coming Up" (Bamonte, Cooper, Gallup, O'Donnell, Smith) – 6:27 (Originally an extra track on the Japanese/Australian versions of Bloodflowers, 2000)
"Signal to Noise" (acoustic version) (Bamonte, Cooper, Gallup, O'Donnell, Smith) – 3:36 (Previously unreleased acoustic recording from the Greatest Hits sessions, due to the fact that "Signal to Noise" was planned to be a single with the B-side "Cut Here", but was switched at the last moment, 2001)
"Signal to Noise" (Bamonte, Cooper, Gallup, O'Donnell, Smith) – 4:07 (Originally the B-side to "Cut Here", 2001)
"Just Say Yes" (Curve Remix) (Bamonte, Cooper, Gallup, O'Donnell, Smith) – 3:18 (Previously unreleased remix made in 2001)
"A Forest" [Plati and Slick Version] (Gallup, Hartley, Smith, Tolhurst) – 6:41 (Previously unreleased remix made in 2001)

References

External links

Join The Dots
B-side compilation albums
2004 compilation albums
Fiction Records compilation albums
Elektra Records compilation albums
Rhino Records compilation albums